Bibek Diyali (born 25 May 1989) is an Indian cricketer. He made his List A debut for Sikkim in the 2018–19 Vijay Hazare Trophy on 23 September 2018. He made his first-class debut for Sikkim in the 2018–19 Ranji Trophy on 28 November 2018. He made his Twenty20 debut for Sikkim in the 2018–19 Syed Mushtaq Ali Trophy on 21 February 2019.

References

External links
 

1989 births
Living people
Indian cricketers
Sikkim cricketers
Place of birth missing (living people)
Wicket-keepers